George Irvine (November 16, 1826 – February 24, 1897) was a Quebec lawyer, judge, professor and political figure. He represented Mégantic in the Legislative Assembly of Quebec from 1867 to 1876 and in the 1st Canadian Parliament from 1867 to 1872 as a Conservative.

He was born in Quebec City in 1826, the son of Lt.-Colonel John George Irvine (1802–1871) of Quebec, and a grandson of James Irvine and Mathew Bell. He studied law and was called to the bar in 1848. He taught commercial law at Morrin College. He served on the municipal council for Quebec City from 1859 to 1862. Irvine was elected to the Legislative Assembly of the Province of Canada for Mégantic in 1863. In 1867, he was elected to both the federal and provincial assemblies; he was named solicitor general in the Quebec cabinet, serving in that post from 1867 to 1873. He was named Queen's Counsel in 1868. Irvine served attorney general for the province from 1873 to 1874. In 1876, he resigned from his seat in the Quebec assembly to serve as commissioner for the Quebec, Montreal, Ottawa and Occidental Railway. He was president of the Quebec Bar from 1872 to 1873 and from 1884 to 1885. Irvine also served as chancellor for Bishop's College from 1875 to 1878. He resigned from the provincial assembly in 1884 to accept an appointment as judge in the Court of Vice-Admiralty in the Quebec district; in 1891, he was named to the Exchequer Court in the same district.

He died in Quebec City in 1897.

References
Biography at the Dictionary of Canadian Biography Online

 

1826 births
1897 deaths
Members of the Legislative Assembly of the Province of Canada from Canada East
Members of the House of Commons of Canada from Quebec
Conservative Party of Canada (1867–1942) MPs
Conservative Party of Quebec MNAs
Politicians from Quebec City
Judges in Quebec
Anglophone Quebec people
Canadian King's Counsel